The Magnets are a five piece British a cappella group, comprising Callum McIntosh, Michael Conway, Nick Girard, Stevie Hutchinson, Ross Hunter and Mc Zani. Hobbit, Alfredo Austin III and Aaron J Boykin also perform with the group.

The group formed while at University College London together in a production of Guys and Dolls.

They signed to EMI and released their debut album, Giving It All That, in 2001.   The following few years saw them tour with Lisa Stansfield, Michael Ball, Tom Jones and Geri Halliwell, with appearances on The Michael Parkinson Show, Blue Peter and GMTV. In 2004, the group released Another Place, which featured nine original songs and two covers, including a rendition of Stephen Stills' "For What It's Worth". Their next album, Gobsmacked, featured songs such as "Girls & Boys" originally by Blur (band), and "Sweet Dreams" by Beyoncé, as well as live favourites such as "Poker Face" by Lady Gaga and "Livin' on a Prayer" by Bon Jovi.

The band has performed in five years of the last eight at the Edinburgh Fringe Festival.  The Magnets undertook a European tour in November and December 2010.

In June 2011, they performed in Adelaide, Australia, as part of the Adelaide Cabaret Festival. Following this, they toured Melbourne, Sydney and Noosa.

On 12 January 2014, the group played their first US date in New York City.

Discography

Studio albums

EPs

Singles

References

External links
 The Magnets official website
 Show Review (Leister Square)
 Interview with the Band

British vocal groups